This list is of the Natural Monuments of Japan within the Prefecture of Aomori.

National Natural Monuments
As of 1 April 2021, twenty Natural Monuments have been designated, including two *Special Natural Monuments; Lake Towada-Oirase River and the northernmost Native Zone of the Japanese camellia span the prefectural borders with Akita.

Prefectural Natural Monuments
As of 12 November 2020, forty Natural Monuments have been designated at a prefectural level.

Municipal Natural Monuments
As of 1 May 2020, one hundred and seventy-two Natural Monuments have been designated at a municipal level.

See also
 Cultural Properties of Japan
 Parks and gardens in Aomori Prefecture
 List of Places of Scenic Beauty of Japan (Aomori)
 List of Historic Sites of Japan (Aomori)

References

External links
  Cultural Properties in Aomori Prefecture

 Aomori
Aomori Prefecture